Big Brother Brasil 23 is the twenty-third season of Big Brother Brasil, which premiered on TV Globo on January 16, 2023. The show is produced by Globo and hosted by Tadeu Schmidt, who returned for his second season as the host.

For the first time, the grand prize (which is expected to be the largest prize money in Big Brother Brasil history) will be unknown until the end. Starting from the standard R$ 1.5 million prize fund, each housemate will be able to increase this amount individually throughout the season by winning competitions or avoiding hitting the eviction block.

For the fourth consecutive year, the show features housemates divided into two groups: "Celebrities", composed of actors, singers, professional athletes, and social media personalities, and "Civilians" composed of everyday Brazilians. Before the premiere, four new potential housemates competed for two spots in the cast as part of a twist, with the winners being sequestered after the results and moving into the house with the rest of the cast on Day 1, bringing the total number of housemates up to 22.

The game

Final prize change throughout the season
After twelve years without adjustments to the maximum prize awarded to the winner of the reality show, the value of the final prize will be increased in this edition. Since Big Brother Brasil 10, that value was R$ 1.5 million, an amount that has sparked discussion in recent seasons due to the inflationary lag and the increasing success of previous alumni leading to future houseguests playing relatively risk-free games with a post-show career in mind, rather than winning the game itself.

This season will have the biggest prize in the history of the reality show. The value of the final award is undefined. This is because it may increase during the course of the season, according to the performance of the housemates.

Each week, on Tuesday elimination nights, three housemates will be chosen by random drawn to try to guess who will be evicted, with a cash value being added to the final prize for each correct answer.

Super HoH
Along with its regular powers, the HoH would also be tasked with splitting their housemates into Haves and Have-Nots as well as choosing what and how much each group would be eating.

Starting this season, the HoH will be able to enjoy a great "Control Center", right from their exclusive room, in a limited and predetermined way, with several commands that allow a privileged point of view of the game.

The HoH will also be able to watch what happens in the rest of the House with audio, find out the total number of votes they received so far;  and the ability to wake up housemates at any time they want.

Roles have limited access, but make the HoH post even more valuable and strategic in the game.

Withdrawal Button 
Since the season twenty-second, there have be an opt-out button. Thus, the housemate who wants to give up the game can just press the button, without having to resort to the diary room or the production of the program, and leave the program immediately.

The item will be visible to all housemates, in the room of the house.  However, the button will be protected in an illuminated box, closed by a hatch, and can only be activated when indicated by the green light. The button will work at certain times, being unavailable and with red light during parties, from 9 pm to 9 am, to prevent housemates from pressing it while intoxicated.

#FeedBBB 
The theme of the reality show is such that each housemate will use a cellphone to capture moments in the house during a time determined by the production. The cell phone only allows them to post photos and videos to #FeedBBB, and see what other housemates say about each other. It does not allow contact with the outside world.

Since the season twenty-one, #FeedBBB introduced "Arrow", an app akin to Tinder, which housemates used to pick out their love interests in the house. The "HoH Podcast" is recorded weekly and published on the GShow website. The housemates can see when it is being recorded but do not hear the content.

In addition to the novelty called "Anonymous Torpedo" has been added to the platform since the twenty-second season, which can further influence the house's relationships. The function allows housemates to send anonymous messages, with no declared author, to other confined people, which are published on the screen in the room for everyone to see.

Selective Collection
The season, the housemates will be rewarded according their waste management in order to promote sustainability. Each week, they will earn Estalecas (Z$) – the House currency – from their selective collection based on a ranking established by production alongside TV Globo's Environmental Management area.

Evicted's Message
For the first time in the show's history, the evicted housemate can leave a video message for someone still in the running.

The video will be addressed and displayed on the home screen, in front of all those inside the House. The evicted housemates will be able to leave an advice, warning, or even doubtful information in order to harm a confined person, according to their personal strategies.

Glass House
On January 10, 2023, four additional housemates entered the Glass house where the public voted for two of them (one man and one woman) to move into the main House.

Twist introduced in Big Brother Brasil 9, re-used in Big Brother Brasil 11 (featuring the first five evicted housemates from that season), Big Brother Brasil 13, Big Brother Brasil 20 and Big Brother Brasil 22.

Duos Twist
During Week 1, the 22 housemates were split into duos where they would compete in competitions and could also be nominated together. The duos were chosen by a public vote held a couple days before the premiere, in which each Civilian was paired with a Celebrity, with the exception of the two Glass House contestants selected by the public to enter.

Housemates entered the House on Day 1 handcuffed to their duo partners and stayed that way up until Night 3.

Secret Room
The duos split up on Day 9 after the reveal of the first public vote. Has been informed that the chosen duo would move to a Secret Room where there would be a second vote to determine which housemate from the duo would be officially evicted as an individual on Day 11.

Higher Power
The housemate who answered the Big Phone on Day 39, won the "Higher Power", it could overthrow the Head of Household, the House votes, the Big Phone or the Counterattack and replace the nominations. This power could only be used once and within the next eviction.

The twist was based on "Coup d'État" from the American Big Brother, was introduced in Big Brother Brasil 10, and re-used in Big Brother Brasil 12.

White Room
On Day 52, two housemates (Domitila and ) were chosen to enter the White Room, where they would stay until the live HoH competition on Day 53, competing in an endurance competition, that would determine the first nominee of the week.

A re-worked version of a twist introduced in Big Brother Brasil 9, re-used in Big Brother Brasil 10 and Big Brother Brasil 20.

Housemate Exchange
On March 13, 2023, a housemate exchange with La Casa de los Famosos was announced. Evicted contestant Key Alves swapped with Dania Méndez from La Casa de los Famosos 3 on Day 59, for a to be determined amount of days.

However, Dania continue in competition from La Casa de los Famosos, while Key has already evicted from Big Brother Brasil. The choice to make the exchange for a housemate who had already been evicted was made due to the rules of the Brazilian's reality show not to bring outside information into the house.

Repechage

Power of Veto
In some weeks, the nominated housemates compete against each other for one last chance to save themselves from eviction. The housemates nominated by the HoH are not eligible to compete and are guaranteed to face Brazil's vote.

Joker Power
Each week, before the house groceries purchases, an advantage or twist of some kind will be offered to all housemates, who can then bid for it in the Diary Room using their in-game currencies, if they wish so. The results will then be displayed to the whole House, with the housemate who entered the Diary Room and bid for the advantage first being the winner, in the event of a tie. The housemates are allowed to share, omit or lie regarding any details related to the bid.

Power of No 
At the beginning of each week, the previous Head of Household may or may not be given the opportunity to disqualify some housemates from competing in the upcoming HoH competition. Houseguests might also be vetoed from competing in HoH by punishments from other competitions or twists.

Big Phone 
Once in a while, the Big Phone rings, unleashing good or bad consequences on the nomination process for those who decide to answer it.

The Counterattack 
The counterattack is a surprise power given to either the HoH's nominee and/or the House's nominee, in which they have the opportunity to automatically nominate an additional housemate for eviction. While viewers are informed when the power will be featured in advance (on Thursdays before the Head of Household competition even takes place), the housemates are only informed about the twist on the spot, during Sunday's live nominations.

Housemates

The cast list was unveiled on January 12, 2023.

Voting history 
 Key
  – Civilians 
  – Celebrities 
  – Glass House Civilians

Notes

Have and Have-Nots

Ratings and reception

Brazilian ratings 
All numbers are in points and provided by Kantar Ibope Media.

References

External links
  

23
2023 Brazilian television seasons